Mordellistena cinnamomea is a beetle in the genus Mordellistena of the family Mordellidae. It was described in 1870 by Fahraeus.

References

cinnamomea
Beetles described in 1870